Phantasia  may refer to:

Concepts
Phantasiai, a concept in Hellenistic philosophy
Lexis (Aristotle), a philosophical concept used by Aristotle
Hyperphantasia, the phenomenon of experiencing extremely vivid mental imagery

Arts and society
Phantasia (album)
Phantasia (poet), a fictitious ancient Egyptian poet, said to have been the creator of the Iliad and Odyssey
Phantasia Press, a publisher of science fiction books
Phantasialand, theme park in Germany
Tales of Phantasia, part of the Tales series of games published by Namco
Phantasia (role-playing game)
Girls' Generation's Phantasia, Girls' Generation 2015 tour

See also
 Fantasia (disambiguation)
 Fantasio (disambiguation)
 Aphantasia